Lake Tappan is a reservoir impounded by the Tappan Dam on the Hackensack River, straddling the border between the U.S. states of New Jersey and New York. Within New Jersey, the lake traverses the border separating the municipalities of River Vale and Old Tappan in Bergen County, while extending northward across the New York state line into the town of Orangetown in Rockand County. The reservoir was formed in 1967, flooding areas that included the former CAPROC Field Civil Air Patrol airstrip.

The Lake Tappan reservoir covers 1,255 acres (5.1 km²), the majority of its area being within New Jersey, and it contains  of water, with up to  released downstream daily into the Oradell Reservoir, which lies entirely within Bergen County in New Jersey. The passage of this water between reservoirs can occur in as rapidly as two to three hours. Lake Tappan has an average depth of 21' with a maximum depth of 43'.

On March 11, 2003, New Jersey Governor Jim McGreevey visited the reservoir and proposed protecting it as well as the nearby Woodcliff Lake Reservoir and their tributaries with Category 1 water purity status.

The reservoir is owned by Suez North America, a private utility.

Lake Tappan is a local fishing spot as well, serving as a habitat for bluegill, bass, perch, catfish and carp.

References

External links

Tappan
Tappan
Hackensack River
Protected areas of Rockland County, New York
Protected areas of Bergen County, New Jersey
Old Tappan, New Jersey
United Water
Tappan
Tappan